Collection: The Shrapnel Years may refer to:

 Collection: The Shrapnel Years (Vinnie Moore album),2006
 Collection: The Shrapnel Years (Greg Howe album), 2006
 Collection: The Shrapnel Years (Tony MacAlpine album), 2006